Canarium commune is a repeatedly synonymized species name and may refer to one of several species in the tree genus Canarium:
Canarium indicum
Canarium vulgare
Canarium asperum
Canarium zeylanicum